Deep (previously Deep2001) is a Japan-based mixed martial arts promoting and sanctioning organization. It is promoted by Shigeru Saeki who is also the former Public Relations Director of Pride Fighting Championships. Their inaugural event took place in 2001 and featured Paulo Filho and Royler Gracie. On May 17, 2008, Deep announced a partnership with ZST to share fighters, co-promote shows and eventually unify the promotions.

History
Deep was established in 2000 as "Deep 2001", and the first event was promoted on January 8, 2001. In 2003, Deep 2001 changed its name to Deep.

Deep started playing the role of a subcontractor for Pride Fighting Championships since Dream Stage Entertainment (DSE) started promoting the Pride Bushido series in September 2003, which focused training Japanese fighters at middleweight and lightweight. As a result, a number of Japanese fighters, such as Ryo Chonan and Ikuhisa Minowa, started their careers fighting in DEEP before moving on to larger and more famous MMA promotions.

Deep is also known as one of the few major Japanese organizations to cultivate Korean talent, including Dong Hyun Kim, Chan Sung Jung, and Doo Ho Choi - all of which have moved on to successful careers in the Ultimate Fighting Championship.

Deep began promoting bouts with female fighters at its 13th event on July 13, 2003.

On February 22, 2008, Deep implemented the weight division system created by Nevada State Athletic Commission (NSAC) for its male fighters.

On December 19, 2009, Deep started to use a UFC-style octagon for their Cage Impact events.

At a press conference held in Macau on December 1, 2010, DEEP announced its first international event, which was to be held in Macau in 2011. However, low levels of interest and dismal tickets sales led DEEP to cancel the event. Deep has yet to host an event outside Japan.

In February 2011, it was announced that Deep and the MMA division of Smash had formed an amateur promotion named the Japan MMA League (JML).

Deep Jewels
On  the all-female MMA promotion Jewels announced that it would cease operations as an independent company, with Yuichi Ozono, then head of Jewels, stepping down and Shigeru Saeki from Deep, formerly supervisor, taking the full direction, and transferring fighters and brand to the new Deep Jewels brand, which would be managed by Deep.

Events

As of April 16, 2013, Deep has held a total of 194 events comprising 2202 fights, all of which have taken place in Japan.

Current Champions

Broadcasters
Deep Based out of Nagoya, Japan. Broadcast their fights locally on SKY PerfecTV! (Fighting TV Samurai channel) and streaming on AbemaTV.

See also
List of Deep champions
List of Deep events
Deep Jewels events
Jewels (mixed martial arts)

References

External links
 Official website
 DEEP event results at sherdog

 
Mixed martial arts organizations
Mixed martial arts in Japan
2001 establishments in Japan